The Hochschule für Kirchenmusik Heidelberg is a university of church music in Heidelberg and one of the most renowned ones in Germany.

It was modeled after the institute in Leipzig, where Poppen had previously studied with its founder, organist Karl Straube.

The institute offers all church music subjects (organ and other instruments, choral conducting, singing) and theoretical subjects (harmony, counterpoint, figured bass, stylistics). 

Notable alumni have included Felix Hell, Martin Lutz, Erna Woll and Hans Rudolf Zöbeley.

References

External links
 

German church music
Music schools in Germany
Christian schools in Germany
Universities and colleges in Baden-Württemberg
Christianity in Baden-Württemberg
Education in Heidelberg
Educational institutions established in 1931
1931 establishments in Germany